Aloïs Verstraeten (born 2 January 1888, date of death unknown) was a Belgian racing cyclist. He rode in the 1919 Tour de France.

References

1888 births
Year of death missing
Belgian male cyclists
Place of birth missing